In the Hindu epic Mahabharata, Nakula (Sanskrit: नकुल) was the fourth of the five Pandava brothers. Nakula and Sahadeva were twins blessed to Madri, by the Ashvini Kumaras, the divine physicians. Their parents  Pandu and Madri - died early, so the twins were adopted by their step-mother, Kunti and were trained by Drona in Hastinapura.

Skilled in Ayurveda, sword fighting, and horse keeping, Nakula is described as the most handsome man in the Mahabharata. Nakula had two wives - Draupadi, the common wife of the five brothers, and Karenumati, daughter of the Chedi king Shishupala. For Yudhishthira's Rajasuya, he conquered the Sivis, the Rohitakas and other dynasties. After the game of dice, the Pandavas and Draupadi were sent into exile for 13 years with the last year being incognito. During the incognito, Nakula disguised himself as a horse trainer named Granthika. In the Kurukshetra War, Nakula killed many warriors, including Vrikasura, Shakuni's son.

Etymology and other names
In Sanskrit, the word nakula means "mongoose" or "mongoose-colored."

Nakula and his brother Sahadeva are both also referred to in the epic as Āśvineya, Aśvinīsuta and Aśvisuta because they are the sons of the Ashvins and as Mādravatīputra, Mādravatīsuta, Mādreya, Mādrinandana, Mādrinandanaka, Mādrīputra, Mādrīsuta, Mādrītanūja because they are the sons of Mādrī.

Birth and early years
Due to Pandu's inability to bear children (because of the curse of Rishi Kindama), Kunti had to use the boon given by Sage Durvasa to give birth to her three children. She shared the boon with Pandu's second wife, Madri, who invoked the Ashvini Kumaras to beget Nakula and Sahadeva, as twins. Madri committed self immolation, called Sati when her husband died   and entrusted her children's care to Kunti. Despite different divine paternal parentage these five children, first three of Kunti - Yudhisthira, Bhima and Arjuna-  and latter two of Madri - Nakula and Sahadeva, were called Pandavas, or sons of Pandu. Nakula was known to be the most handsome person in the Kuru lineage.

In his childhood, Nakula mastered his skills in fencing and knife throwing under his father Pandu and a hermit named Suka at the Satasringa ashram. Later, Pandu lost his life when he attempted to make love with his wife, Madri. She committed suicide. Thus, Nakula along with his brothers moved to Hastinapura where he was brought up by Kunti. Kunti loved him as much as her own sons.

Nakula greatly improved his archery and swordplay skills under the tutelage of Drona. Nakula turned out to be an accomplished wielder of the sword. Along with the other Pandava brothers, Nakula was trained in religion, science, administration, and military arts by the Kuru preceptors Kripacharya and Dronacharya. He was particularly skilled at horse-riding.

Skills
 Horse-keeping: Nakula's deep understanding of horse breeding and training is documented in the Mahabharata after the death of Narakasura by Krishna. In a conversation with Virata, Nakula claimed to know the art of treating all illnesses of horses. He was also a highly skilled charioteer.
 Ayurveda: Being a son of the physicians, Ashvini Kumaras, Nakula was also believed to be an expert in Ayurveda.
 Swordsman: Nakula was a brilliant swordsman and he showed his skills of a sword while killing the sons of Karna on the 18th day of Kurukshetra war.

Marriage and Children
When the Pandavas and their mother, Kunti were in hiding after the event of Lakshagriha, Arjuna won Draupadi's hand in marriage. Nakula married her along with his brothers and had a son, Shatanika who was killed by Ashwatthama in the Kurukshetra War.

He also married Karenumati, the daughter of Shishupala, who bore him one son, Niramitra.

Rajasuya conquests

Nakula was sent west by Yudhisthira to subjugate kingdoms for the Rajasuya sacrifice, after crowning as the Emperor of Indraprastha. Nakula set forth to the kingdom once dominated by Vasudeva with a huge army. He first attacked the prosperous mountainous country of Rohitaka. He defeated the Mattamyurakas of the land in a fierce encounter. In another battle with the sage Akrosha, Nakula subjugated the regions of Sairishaka and Mahetta. He also defeated many tribes and small dynasties, including the Dasarnas, the Sivis, the Trigartas, the Amvashtas, the Malavas, the five tribes of the Karnatas, the Madhyamakeyas, the Vattadhanas and the Utsava-sanketas.

Exile
Yudhishthira's loss in the game of dice meant that all Pandavas had to live in exile for 13 years. Once in exile, Jatasura, disguised as a Brahmin, kidnapped Nakula along with Draupadi, Sahadeva and Yudhishthira. Bhima rescued them eventually and in the fight that ensued, Nakula killed Kshemankara, Mahamaha, and Suratha. In the 13th year, Nakula disguised himself as an ostler and assumed the name of Granthika (between themselves, the Pandavas called him Jayasena) at the Kingdom of Virata. He worked as a horse-trainer who looked after horses in the royal stable.

Role in the Kurukshetra War

Nakula desired Drupada to be the general of the Pandava army, but Yudhishthira and Arjuna opted for Dhristadyumna.

As a warrior, Nakula slew prominent war-heroes on the enemy side. The flag of Nakula's chariot bore the image of a red deer with a golden back. Nakula was the leader of one of the seven Akshahuni.

On the 1st day of the war, Nakula defeated Dussasana, sparing his life so that Bhima could fulfill his oath.

On the 11th day, Nakula defeated Shalya, destroying his chariot.

On the 13th day, his advance into Dronacharya's formation was repulsed by Jayadratha.

On the night of the 14th day, he vanquished  Shakuni.

On the 15th day, he was defeated by Duryodhana in a one-on-one duel.

On the 16th day, he was defeated and spared by Karna.
On the 18th day, he killed Karna's sons Chitrasena, Satyasena and Sushena.

Later life and death
After the war, Yudhishthira appointed Nakula as the King of Northern Madra and Sahadeva as King of southern Madra.

Upon the onset of Kali Yuga and the departure of Krishna, the Pandavas retired. Giving up all their belongings and ties, the Pandavas and 
Draupadi, along with a dog, made their final journey of pilgrimage to the Himalayas.

Except Yudhishthira, all of the Pandavas grew weak and died before reaching heaven. Nakula was the third one to fall after Draupadi and Sahadeva. When Bhima asked Yudhishthira why Nakula fell, Yudhishthira replied that Nakula took pride in his beauty and believed that there was nobody equal to him in looks.

References

Sources
 
 
 

Characters in the Mahabharata